Fire & Damnation is the third studio album by the German thrash metal band Exumer. It was released 25 years after the band's previous album, Rising from the Sea (1987), on 6 April 2012 through Metal Blade Records.

The album was engineered and produced by Waldemar Sorychta. Drums were recorded at Waldstreetsound Studio in Dortmund, all guitars and vocals were recorded at Sonarklang Studio in Haltern. Fire & Damnation was mixed by Sorychta and Dennis Koehne at Flying Pigs Studio in Schwerte.

Track listing

Personnel 
 Mem V. Stein – vocals
 Ray Mensh – guitar
 H.K. – guitar
 T. Schiavo – bass
 Matthias Kassner – drums
 Waldemar Sorychta – engineer, producer
 Dennis Koehne – mixing, mastering

References

External links 
Exumer "Fire & Damnation"

2012 albums
Metal Blade Records albums
Exumer albums
Albums produced by Waldemar Sorychta